Glenn Dwight Wilson (born December 22, 1958) is a former professional baseball player. He played ten seasons in Major League Baseball, between 1982 and 1993, for the Detroit Tigers, Philadelphia Phillies, Seattle Mariners, Pittsburgh Pirates, and Houston Astros. He was primarily used as a right fielder.

Biography
Born in Baytown, Texas, Wilson attended Channelview High School and Sam Houston State University.

Wilson was selected in the 1st round (18th pick) of the 1980 amateur draft by the Tigers. He made his major league debut on April 15, 1982. After the season Wilson was named Tigers Rookie of the Year. He played two seasons for the Tigers, hitting .292 as a rookie then driving in 65 runs in 1983 making him a valuable player for a trade. Being only 24, he was then traded on March 24, 1984 along with John Wockenfuss to the Philadelphia Phillies for Willie Hernández and Dave Bergman.

Wilson was best known for his strong throwing arm, and he led all National League outfielders for assists in 1985, 1986, and 1987, throwing out 18, 19 and 20 base-runners from right field, respectively. In 1987, Wilson three times threw out base runners who attempted to reach first base after apparent singles into right field. His most successful season as a batter was in 1985, when he drove in 102 runs, and recorded 167 base hits with 14 home runs in 608 at bats for a .275 batting average. He was selected as a National League All-Star in 1985. On August 5, 1987 he pitched in the bottom on the 8th inning in a game against the New York Mets when the Phillies ran out of relief pitchers and manager Lee Elia put him on the mound. In the only pitching appearance of his career he pitched a 1-2-3 inning, which included striking out Howard Johnson.

Wilson was dealt along with Mike Jackson and Dave Brundage from the Phillies to the Seattle Mariners for Phil Bradley and Tim Fortugno at the Winter Meetings on December 9, 1987. On September 15, 1988, Wilson hit two home runs off Randy Johnson, the first two homers ever surrendered by Johnson. At the start of the following season, Wilson again tagged Johnson for a homer.

Wilson owned and operated a gas station in Conroe, Texas. From 1988 to 2006, he was a manager in independent minor league baseball for the Amarillo Dillas, Coastal Bend Aviators of the Central Baseball League and the Chillicothe Paints of the Frontier League. He released his autobiography, co-written with Darrell Halk and titled Headed Home: A [sic] MLB All-Star's Search for Truth, in 2012. Wilson is a licensed ordained minister.

According to writer-director Rick Linklater, the character Glenn McReynolds (played by Tyler Hoechlin) in the 2016 film Everybody Wants Some!! is based on Wilson at Sam Houston State. Wilson filed a lawsuit against Linklater for using his name to promote the movie. Wilson did not remember Linklater ever being in a game since he was a freshman while Wilson was a junior.

References

External links

Major League Baseball right fielders
Detroit Tigers players
Philadelphia Phillies players
Seattle Mariners players
Pittsburgh Pirates players
Houston Astros players
National League All-Stars
Montgomery Rebels players
Evansville Triplets players
Birmingham Barons players
Richmond Braves players
Buffalo Bisons (minor league) players
Sam Houston Bearkats baseball players
Baseball players from Texas
1958 births
Living people